Zuhur Kiram  (Arabic: زهور كرام) (15 February 1961, Settat, Morocco) she is a Moroccan novelist, critic, academic and professor of higher education  in kenitra, Morocco. She's Head of Scientific Projects and PhD research units, and Head of the language creativity and new media Laboratory.

About her life 
She holds a state doctorate in the analysis of narrative discourse.

Memberships 
She did several memberships including:

 A former member of jury committees, including AL Owais prize, the book prize for the Moroccan Ministry of culture and other jury committees.
 Member of advisory and scientific boards for Moroccan and Arab magazines. Member of the committees of reading manuscripts for Moroccan and Arab publishing houses.
 An organization of Arab and international conferences and symposia.

Her business 
Some of kiram's achievements:

 A Body and a City, Dar and Leila, 1996
 Travel in Man, Al-Bukili Publications, 1998
 In the Hospitality of Censorship, Time Publications, 2001
 Carnation necklace, House of culture, 2004
 Bibliography of Maghreb innovators, Dar Al-Aman, in partnership with Dr. Muhammad Qasimi, 2006
 The Birth of the Soul, Publications of the Short Story Research Group, 2008
 The speech of the gods of narcotics, "An Approach to the Arab and Moroccan Women's Speech", Roya Publishing and Distribution, 2009
 Digital Literature "Cultural Questions and Conceptual Reflections", Vision for Publishing and Distribution, 2009
 The Arabic Novel and the Time of Formation from a Contextual Perspective, Arab House for Science Publishers, 2012
 Future Enlightenment Thought on Curriculum, Dar Al-Aman for Publishing and Distribution, 2018
 Mahdi Al-Manjara, Cultural Center for Books, 2019
 The Enlightenment Thought of Al-Mahdi Al-Manjar, New Dilmun House, 2019
 Humanities and Digital in the Post-Corona Era, Spaces for Publishing and Distribution, 2020

Awards 

 She received the royal Moroccan sash (national Efficiency) among 14 Moroccan and International personalities in 2012 at the Casablanca International Book Fair.
 The Katara Prize for Arabic Fiction, in the critical studies Branch for the year 2016, for the study "Towards Awareness of the Transformations of the Arab Narrative Narrative".

Wrote about her 

 The book "The Sedition of Creativity and the Critical Question in the Experience of Zuhour Karam" issued by the Moroccan Institution of Approaches to Publishing, presented by Said Yaktine.
 "Today, Zohour Karam is considered one of the most active names in the Moroccan literary scene."

References 

1961 births
Living people
Moroccan writers